The 1974 Utah State Aggies football team was an American football team that represented Utah State University as an independent during the 1974 NCAA Division I football season. In their second season under head coach Phil Krueger, the Aggies compiled an 8–3 record, but were outscored by opponents by a total of 199 to 181 – principally due to a 72–3 loss to 1974 national champion Oklahoma.

The team's statistical leaders included Bill Swanson with 614 passing yards, Louie Giammona with 1,534 rushing yards, Kory Coles with 225 receiving yards, Al Knapp with 67 points scored (16 field goals and 19 extra points), Larry Comadena with 16 pancake blocks, and Brian Longuevan with 138 total tackles.

Schedule

References

Utah State
Utah State Aggies football seasons
Utah State Aggies football